The 1988 Montana Grizzlies football team represented the University of Montana in the 1988 NCAA Division I-AA football season as a member of the Big Sky Conference. The Grizzlies were led by third-year head coach Don Read, played their home games at Washington–Grizzly Stadium and finished the season with a record of eight wins and four losses (8–4, 6–2 Big Sky).

Schedule

Source:

References

Montana
Montana Grizzlies football seasons
Montana Grizzlies football